Sir Francis Wyndham, 1st Baronet (c. 1612 – 15 July 1676) of Trent, Dorset was an English soldier and politician who sat in the House of Commons of England at various times from 1640 until his death in 1676. During the First English Civil War, he served as a colonel in the Royalist army and helped Charles II of England escape to France after his defeat in the 1651 Third English Civil War.

Biography

Francis Wyndham was born around 1610, fifth surviving son of Sir Thomas Wyndham (1570-1631), and his wife Elizabeth Coningsby (died 1635). His father came from the Kentsford Wyndhams, a cadet branch of the Orchard Wyndhams, a numerous and powerful grouping within the Somerset gentry. He was one of five sons, including Edmund Wyndham (1600-1681); three of his brothers were killed during the 1638 to 1651 Wars of the Three Kingdoms.

In 1646, he married Anne Gerard, daughter and heir of Thomas Gerard (1593-1634), owner of Trent, Dorset, then in Somerset. They had three sons, Thomas (1648-1691), Francis (1654-1716), and Gerard.

Career
Wyndham spent some of the 1630s travelling and studying in Europe, graduating from the University of Padua in 1635. He returned to England and in April 1640 was elected MP for Minehead in the Short Parliament. When the First English Civil War began in August 1642, Wyndham became a Royalist colonel; in June 1643, he was appointed governor of Dunster Castle, one of the last Royalist positions in the West Country to hold out, surrendering in April 1646.  

The Wyndham family was closely connected to the future Charles II of England; Lady Christabella, Francis' sister-in-law and wife of his elder brother Edmund, had been successively Charles' wet nurse, tutor and first lover. Along with his uncle Sir Hugh (1603-1663) who owned a nearby estate at Pilsdon, Wyndham was instrumental in his escape after the Battle of Worcester in 1651, hiding him in his house at Trent, Dorset for several days.  

During The Protectorate, he was briefly arrested on suspicion of involvement in the 1655 Penruddock uprising before being released without charge. Following the 1660 Stuart Restoration, he was elected MP for Milbourne Port in the Convention Parliament, then re-elected in 1661 for the Cavalier Parliament where he sat until his death. He was also given commissioned as a major in the Royal Horse Guards. 

Wyndham inherited Pilsdon when his uncle died in 1663 and was created a baronet on 18 November 1673, apparently in return for foregoing a claim on the Exchequer for £10,800 granted in 1670. He died three years later at the age of 64 and is buried in St Andrews' parish church in Trent.

Notes

References

Sources
 
 
 
 
 
 
 

1610s births
1676 deaths
Cavaliers
Baronets in the Baronetage of England
English MPs 1640 (April)
English MPs 1661–1679
Military personnel from Somerset
Royal Horse Guards officers
Deputy Lieutenants of Somerset
Royalist military personnel of the English Civil War
University of Padua alumni